Eric Bocoum (born 16 March 1999) is a Gabonese professional footballer who plays as a forward for Persian Gulf Pro League club Gol Gohar.

Career
On 31 March 2022, Bocoum was announced as a new signing by Istiklol, with the club confirming his departure at the end of his loan spell on 4 July 2022.

Career statistics

Club

Honors
Istiklol
 Tajik Supercup (1): 2022

References

External links
 

1996 births
Living people
Gabonese footballers
Association football midfielders
CF Mounana players
Gol Gohar players
Gabonese expatriate footballers
Gabonese expatriate sportspeople in Iran
Expatriate footballers in Iran
Persian Gulf Pro League players
Expatriate footballers in Tajikistan
Gabonese expatriate sportspeople in Tajikistan